Kalininsky is a rural locality (a village) in Austrumsky Selsoviet, Iglinsky District, Bashkortostan, Russia. The population was 37 as of 2010. There are 2 streets.

Geography 
Kalininsky is located 31 km east of Iglino (the district's administrative centre) by road. Austrum is the nearest rural locality.

References 

Rural localities in Iglinsky District